Jafaria Students Organization is a Shiite Muslim students organisation in Pakistan.it has a country wide presence.Provinces including Azad Kashmir and Gilgit-Baltistan it has "around 100 plus units in Pakistan. It's also Part of Tehrik-e-Jafaria and Shia Ulema Council in Pakistan!

Purpose
The objective of the Organisation is to build the lives of the young generation in accordance with the teachings of the Quran, Prophet Muhammad and his progeny, so that they may become good and pious human beings, to defend the sanctity of the religion of Islam as well the geographical and ideological boundaries of the god gifted Pakistan.

History
Jafaria Students Organization is a Shiite Muslim students' organisation in Pakistan. It was founded by Syed Iftikhar Hussain Naqvi and Sajid Raza Thaheem after splitting from Imamia Students Organization over differences with Maulana Syed Sajid Ali Naqvi.

List of Central Presidents of Jafaria Students Organization Pakistan

See also
 Shia Ulema Council
 Tehreek-e-Jafaria
 Arif Hussain Hussaini
 Talib Jauhari
 Sipah-e-Muhammad Pakistan
 Imamia Students Organisation
 Majlis Wahdat-e-Muslimeen

References

External links
 http://jsopakistan.org/
 https://www.facebook.com/jsopakistan

 
Student societies in Pakistan
Shia organizations
Shia Islam in Pakistan
Student religious organisations in Pakistan
University of Karachi
1997 establishments in Pakistan
Student organizations established in 1997